Alan de Neville may refer to:

 Alan de Neville (landholder) (fl. 1168), English landowner in Lincolnshire
 Alan de Neville (forester) (died c. 1176), English nobleman and administrator